The Canton of Saint-Laurent-du-Var-Cagnes-sur-Mer-Est is a former French canton, located in the arrondissement of Grasse, in the Alpes-Maritimes département (Provence-Alpes-Côte d'Azur région). It had 37,102 inhabitants (2012).

History
The canton was created in 1982 adding part of Cagnes-sur-Mer to the pre-existent Canton of Saint-Laurent-du-Var. It was disbanded following the French canton reorganisation which came into effect in March 2015.

Geography

Municipalities
The canton comprised the following 2 communes:

 Saint-Laurent-du-Var (administrative seat)
 Cagnes-sur-Mer (limited tho the eastern part)

Description
Only the eastern part of Cagnes, close to the borders with Cros-de-Cagnes, is part of this canton. The town is also part (and seat) of the cantons Cagnes-sur-Mer-Centre and Cagnes-sur-Mer-Ouest (C. West).

Demographics

See also
Métropole Nice Côte d'Azur
Cantons of the Alpes-Maritimes department
Arrondissements of the Alpes-Maritimes department

References

External links
 Saint-Laurent-du-Var-Cagnes-sur-Mer-Est on GeneaWiki

Former cantons of Alpes-Maritimes
2015 disestablishments in France
States and territories disestablished in 2015